The Franklin Feed Mill is located in Franklin, Sheboygan County, Wisconsin. It was listed on the National Register of Historic Places in 1985 and on the State Register of Historic Places in 1989.

References

Grinding mills on the National Register of Historic Places in Wisconsin
National Register of Historic Places in Sheboygan County, Wisconsin
Industrial buildings completed in 1856

Grinding mills in Wisconsin
Removed dams in Wisconsin